Amanda Kay Butler (born March 6, 1972) is an American college basketball coach and former player. In 2018, Butler was hired as the head coach of the Clemson Tigers women's basketball team. Prior to that, she was the head coach for the Florida Gators women's basketball team and the Charlotte 49ers women's basketball team.

Career
Amanda Butler was born in Mt. Juliet, Tennessee, in 1972.  She attended Mt. Juliet High School, graduating in 1990.  She was recruited to play for the University of Florida by the Gators' head coach, Carol Ross, and started at guard for four years.  After finishing her playing career in 1994, she transitioned into coaching.  Her first coaching job was as an assistant coach at Florida, where she continued her education with a Master of Science degree in Exercise and Sport Science, in 1997.  After leaving her job with Florida in 1997, she coached at Austin Peay from 1997 to 2001, and served as the associate head coach for former Charlotte head coach Katie Meier from 2001 to 2005.

Butler became the sixth head coach of the Charlotte 49ers women's basketball program on April 19, 2005.  She was named Atlantic 10 Conference Coach of the Year after twenty wins and a share of the regular season championship in her first year as coach.

After Carolyn Peck was released as the Gators head coach following the 2006–07 season, Butler returned to her alma mater as the new head coach of the Gators women's basketball program on April 13, 2007. She was fired on March 6, 2017, her 45th birthday.

Butler then was hired on as head coach at Clemson. Butler led an incredible turnaround in her first year at Clemson.  In their previous season, the Tigers finished 11–19 and 1–15 in ACC play.  Butler led the team to a 9–7 ACC record and was voted the ACC Coach of the Year in 2018. The Tigers turnaround during Butler's first season marked the largest turnaround under a first-year head coach in ACC history.

USA Basketball

In 2009, Butler served as an assistant coach to the U19 team, and competed in the FIBA Women's U19 World Championship. The USA lost the opening round game against Spain 90–86, but then went on to win their next eight games. In the quarterfinals, the USA team faced France, which held an eight-point lead late in the second half, but the USA team took back the lead and won by eleven to advance to the semifinals. After beating Canada in the semifinals, they had a rematch against Spain, for the championship. This time the USA jumped out to an early lead, with a score of 33–16 at the end of the first quarter. The USA went on to win 87–71 to win the gold medal.

Head coaching record

See also 

 Florida Gators
 History of the University of Florida
 List of University of Florida alumni
 University Athletic Association

References

External links 
 Gators women's basketball

1972 births
Living people
American women's basketball coaches
American women's basketball players
Basketball coaches from Tennessee
Basketball players from Tennessee
Charlotte 49ers women's basketball coaches
Clemson Tigers women's basketball coaches
Florida Gators women's basketball coaches
Florida Gators women's basketball players
People from Mount Juliet, Tennessee
Point guards